Crambus moeschleralis is a moth in the family Crambidae. It was described by William Schaus in 1940. It is found in Puerto Rico.

References

Crambini
Moths described in 1940
Moths of the Caribbean